Crisiidae is a family of bryozoans in the suborder Articulina.

References

External links 
 
 
 Crisiidae at fossilworks
 Crisiidae at WoRMS

Cyclostomatida
Bryozoan families